Charles III is head of state of 15 Commonwealth realms and has had 17 prime ministers throughout his reign. Within the Westminster system in each realm, the King's government is headed by a prime minister. Appointment and dismissal of prime ministers are common reserve powers that can be exercised by the King or his governors-general. To date, Charles has appointed two new prime ministers; Rishi Sunak as Prime Minister of the United Kingdom on 25 October 2022 and Chris Hipkins as Prime Minister of New Zealand on 25 January 2023.

List of prime ministers

Antigua and Barbuda

Australia

The Bahamas

Belize

Canada

Grenada

Jamaica

New Zealand

Jacinda Ardern was the incumbent prime minister when Charles became king.

Papua New Guinea

Saint Kitts and Nevis

Saint Lucia

Saint Vincent and the Grenadines

Solomon Islands

Tuvalu

United Kingdom

Liz Truss was the incumbent prime minister when Charles became king.

See also
 Constitutional monarchy
 Commonwealth of Nations
 List of Commonwealth heads of government

Charles III
Commonwealth realms
Charles III, Prime Ministers
Charles III